Alfusainey Jatta (born 5 August 1999) is a Gambian footballer who plays as a midfielder for Pinzgau Saalfelden on loan from MFK Vyškov.

References

External links 
 

1999 births
Living people
Gambian footballers
Gambian expatriate footballers
Association football midfielders
Gamtel FC players
MFK Vyškov players
North Texas SC players
USL League One players
Austrian Regionalliga players
The Gambia youth international footballers
Expatriate soccer players in the United States
Expatriate footballers in Austria
Gambian expatriate sportspeople in the United States
Ghanaian expatriate sportspeople in Austria